Mary Lourdes Gillespie Baird (born May 12, 1935) is an Ecuadorian-born American lawyer and jurist who previously served as a United States district judge for the United States District Court for the Central District of California.

Early life and education

Baird was born as Lourdes Gillespie in Quito, Ecuador on May 12, 1935, the seventh child of Josefina Delgado and James C. Gillespie. A year later the family relocated to Los Angeles, California, where Baird was raised a devout Catholic and enrolled in Catholic all-girls schools. After graduating high school, she went to a secretarial college before marrying businessman William T. Baird, with whom she had three children. She then returned to school and went on to receive an Associate of Arts degree from Los Angeles City College in 1971, a Bachelor of Arts degree in sociology from the University of California, Los Angeles in 1973, and a Juris Doctor from the UCLA School of Law in 1976.

Career

Baird was an Assistant United States Attorney of the Central District of California from 1977 to 1983. She was in private practice in Los Angeles from 1983 to 1986. She was a judge on the East Los Angeles Municipal Court from 1986 to 1987, on the Los Angeles Municipal Court from 1987 to 1988, and on the Superior Court of Los Angeles County from 1988 to 1990. She was the United States Attorney for the Central District of California from 1990 to 1992.

From 1986 to 1990 she was an adjunct professor at Loyola Law School.

Federal judicial service

On April 2, 1992, Baird was nominated by President George H. W. Bush to a new seat on the United States District Court for the Central District of California created by 104 Stat. 5089. This was particularly impressive because she is a Latina and a Republican-turned-Democrat who was nominated by two white Republican men, ahead of "three highly qualified Republican male candidates." She was confirmed by the United States Senate on August 11, 1992, and received her commission on August 12, 1992. She assumed senior status on May 12, 2004, retiring completely on April 15, 2005.

See also
List of Hispanic/Latino American jurists

References

Sources
 
 Confirmation hearings on federal appointments : hearings before the Committee on the Judiciary, United States Senate, One Hundred Second Congress, first session, on confirmation hearings on appointments to the federal judiciary. pt.9 (1993) 

1935 births
Living people
Assistant United States Attorneys
California state court judges
Ecuadorian emigrants to the United States
Hispanic and Latino American judges
Judges of the United States District Court for the Central District of California
Los Angeles City College alumni
People from Quito
Superior court judges in the United States
United States Attorneys for the Central District of California
United States district court judges appointed by George H. W. Bush
20th-century American judges
UCLA School of Law alumni
20th-century American women judges